The R326 is a regional route in the Western Cape province of South Africa that connects Stanford in the south-west to the N2 highway between Caledon and Riviersonderend to the north-east.

Route
It begins at an intersection with the R43 at Stanford and runs east up the valley of the Klein River and over the Akkedisberg Pass.

References

External links
 
 Routes Travel Info
 Akkedisberg Pass

326